Pardo (Hebrew: פרדו) is a very old surname of Sephardic Jewish origin and that derives from the Greek and Latin name Pardus which means leopard, to later change to Spanish Pardo meaning brown and referring to the color of the feline, in Latin "Panthera pardus" (leopard); nicknamed of this way because of those Jews who had the characteristic tan skin color. Israel was conquered by the Greeks and Romans, and many Jews began to adopt Greeks and Latin names.  This surname belongs to the Jewish people who settled in the Iberian Peninsula, being at that time the ancient Roman province of Hispania, which later with the arrival of Christianity, some Jews would convert to have a better social status, this being long before being forced  to convert to Christianity by the Catholic Monarchs or their subsequent expulsion.  Today it is also found in countries including Israel, Spain, Colombia, Greece, Turkey, the United States, Curaçao, Mexico, Peru, Argentina, Venezuela, Chile and Italy.  Members of the Pardo family have distinguished themselves mainly in the Levante region of the Mediterranean.

Traces of Jewish life are known in the Iberian peninsula since Roman times, since those Jews exiled from Jerusalem were in these territories, including those nicknamed as pardus by the Romans themselves.  However, for the subject that interests us we must go back to the years after the expulsion of the Jews first from Spain (1492) and then from Portugal (1496).  This diaspora within the diaspora, which gave rise to the Sephardim, led many to settle in cities of the Ottoman Empire, in many cases sponsored by its authorities, who not only welcomed this group of immigrants, but encouraged them to settle in regions that had not long been conquered, to consolidate Ottoman sovereignty.

This surname spread after the different persecutions by the Catholic Monarchs.  Many Jews were forced to leave Spain and spread to various European territories, such as Thessaloniki (Greece), Bitola (city of North Macedonia), the Netherlands, Greece, Italy, Serbia, Bosnia and Herzegovina, and  after the conquest of America they went to the new Spanish colonies, where persecution continued under the auspices of the Tribunal of the Holy Office of the Inquisition.

Notable Jewish people with the surname 
Among the recognized Jewish characters with this surname we have:

David ben Jacob Pardo: Rabbinic commentator and liturgical poet, born in Venice on March 29, 1719, and died in Jerusalem in 1792, son of Jacob Pardo de Ragusa, Rabbi of Venice.  After finishing his studies, Pardo left Venice and went to Ragusa.  Later he lived for some years in Sarajevo (Bosnia), where he dedicated himself to teaching.  From Sarajevo he moved to Spalato (Dalmatia), where Rabbi Abraham David Papo hired him as a teacher in the yeshibah.
Isaac ben David Pardo : The rabbi of Sarajevo, Bosnia, brother of Jacob Pardo.  He is the author of "To'afot Re'em" (Thessaloniki, 1801), a commentary on R. Ahai's responsa of Shabja, with an index of the different responsa.
Jacob Vita Pardo: Son of David Samuel Pardo, born in Ragusa 1822 and died in 1843 in Padua, where he was a student of the Rabbinicum Collegium, and his body was transported to Verona for burial.  Five of his sermons, preached at Padua and Verona, were published after his death.
David ben José Pardo : The rabbi, born in Amsterdam, son of José Pardo, Hazzan in London.  He translated into Spanish under the title of "Compendio de Dinim" (Amsterdam, 1689) of his father "Shulḥan Tahor."  The other works attributed to him by Fürst ("Bibl. Jud." Iii. 67) were written by David ben Jacob Pardo.
José ben David Pardo : Ḥazzan English;  died in 1677. They seem to have come to London from Amsterdam, where his father, David, was a rabbi.  He wrote "Shulḥan Ṭahor," a compendium of the first two parts of Shulḥan by Joseph Caro 'Aruk, which was edited by his son, David and printed in Amsterdam in 1686, dedicated to the "Kaal Kodes of London", but with an endorsement  of the din bet of Amsterdam.  The book has been reprinted several times: Frankfort-on-the-Main, 1696 and, with notes by Moses Isserles, 1713;  and Frankfort-en-el-Oder, 1704.
José Pardo (rabbi): The rabbi, born in Thessaloniki, died in Amsterdam October 10, 1619. He emigrated to Holland and was appointed Hakam of the Ya'aḳob Apuesta congregation in Amsterdam, founded by Jacob Tirado, occupying a position of  1597 until his death.  In 1615 he founded the Brotherhood of the Orphans and Moher ha-Betulot, now the Company of Dotar Orphas e Donzelas de Santa.  Some liturgical poems by him are included in the "Imre Noam" (Amsterdam, 1628; very rare).  His eldest son, Isaac Pardo, died at Uskup in Turkey, and his second son, Abraham Pardo, in Jerusalem. [1]
Josías Pardo : Dutch rabbi, son-in-law and disciple of Saúl Levi Morteira.  He removed to Rotterdam, where he was a teacher in the Pintos yeshibah, which was transferred to Amsterdam in 1669. He was also Hakam of the Hōnen dallim charity society.  He emigrated to Curaçao, where Hakam was in 1674, and later a similar position was filled in Jamaica.
Jacob Ben David Pardo : Rabbi in Ragusa and Split in the 18th century.  He was the author of: "Marpe Lashon" (Venice, 1780), prayers and religious poems for children, printed together with his "Tehillah ser-Ereẓ," poems about the earthquake in Ragusa;  "Ḳehillat and" aḳob "(IB 1784), commentary on previous prophets;" Toḳfo shel Nes "(IB 1789), introduction to Aaron Cohen Ragusano's" Ma'aseh Nissim ";" Appe Zuṭre "(IB 1797),  novellæ that the Treatise "Hilkot Ishshut", that is, the precepts for women; "Minḥat Aharon" (IB 1809), precepts for the religious ritual upon awakening, for the three daily prayers and the moral precepts; "Mamilla Ya'aḳob  "(Livorno, 1824), commentary on Isaiah, published by his son David Samuel.
Giuseppe Pardo Roques: He was a principal deputy of Pisa, a prestigious Jewish philanthropist and President of the Jewish community of Pisa, Italy, who was assassinated at his home by the Nazis in August 1944. Giuseppe Pardo Roques Mansion is located in Via Sant  'Andrea, today's mansion is a private residence, but its interior remains much the same as during the 1940s. There are two commemorative plaques, one remembering Pisan the Jews who died in World War I and another rabbi remembering Augusto Hasda and his  wife Bettina Segre, of whom died in concentration camps.
Tamir Pardo: is the former Director of the Mossad, assuming the role of Meir Dagan, on January 1, 2011. The appointment was announced by Israeli Prime Minister Benjamin Netanyahu on November 29, 2010. [2]
Claudia Sheinbaum Pardo (born 1962): is a Mexican academic and political activist of Jewish origin, graduated in physics from the National Autonomous University of Mexico, Teacher and PhD in Energy Engineering from the National Autonomous University of Mexico.  She did her doctoral research at the Lawrence Berkeley Laboratory.  Graduated from the Program for Advanced Studies in Sustainable Development of the Colegio de México and the Rockefeller Foundation;  She is also a member of the National System of Researchers and of the Mexican Academy of Sciences.  She was an advisor to the National Commission for Energy Saving and to the Economic Studies Management of the Federal Electricity Commission. [3] [4]
Moisés ben Raphael Pardo : rabbi and rabbinical emissary.  Pardo was born in Jerusalem.  After serving as a Rabbi in Jerusalem for many years, he left the city in 1870, traveling to North Africa on a mission on behalf of Jerusalem.  On his return journey, in 1871 he stopped in Alexandria and accepted an offer to serve as the rabbi of the Jewish community, a position he held until his death.  Pardo was the author of Hora'ah de Veit-Din (Izmir, 1872), on the laws of divorce;  Shemo Moshe (ibid., 1874), responsa and Zedek u-Mishpat (. Ibid, 1874), novellae to Hoshen Mishpat.
Rosina Asser-Pardo: Born in Greece in 1933, she was a survivor of the Nazi holocaust, she was forced into hiding with her family during the German occupation ten years later.  Using the pseudonym, Roula Karakotsou, she wrote a diary about the events between the beginning of the war, her escape from Thessaloniki with her family, and a little about her life in hiding.  Sixty-two years later, he incorporated this diary into this report, which more fully describes the events, weather, and atmosphere during this period of persecution.  Rosina Asser Pardo, one of the many Jews who were hidden like children during the Holocaust by non-Jews.  Asser Pardo went into hiding for 548 days, except when a single soldier turned a blind eye to protect her and her family.  "Rosina's story was a deep memory that each of us, individually, has the extraordinary power to impact many in ways we cannot even see or know, from simple acts of kindness" —— Kansler.
Dr. Sharon Pardo: member of the Department of Politics and Government and Director of the Center for the Study of European Politics and Society (CSEPS), has been awarded the prestigious Jean Monnet Chair ad personam.  academic in Israel.
Juan Pardo (explorer): Captain Juan Pardo was a Spanish explorer and conqueror of Jewish origin, who was active in the second half of the 16th century.  He led two Spanish expeditions in the southeastern United States, through what are now North Carolina and South Carolina and eastern Tennessee.  During his first expedition, Pardo established good relations with the Indian tribes and mainly sought food for the Jesuit mission of Santa Elena, also establishing Fort San Felipe (1566), the first Spanish settlements in South Carolina.
Samuel Ros Pardo: (Valencia, April 9, 1904 - Madrid, January 6, 1945), Spanish politician, journalist, writer, playwright and humorist of Jewish origin.
Eldad Pardo: He is an Iranian professor at the Hebrew University of Jerusalem and an expert in Middle Eastern strategy, culture and politics.
Guido Pardo Roques: President and CEO of Philips Electronics (Israel), General Director of Medical Systems of Philips Technologies

Other people with the surname
 Al Pardo (born 1962), Spanish-born former professional baseball player
 Alejandro Pardo (born 1993), Italian motorcycle racer born in Spain
 Anselmo Pardo Alcaide (1913–1977), Spanish entomologist 
 Arsenio Iglesias Pardo (born 1930), Galician (Spanish) football player and coach
 Arvid Pardo (1914–1999), Maltese diplomat and scholar born in Italy
 Bernard Pardo (born 1960), French football player
 Bernardo P. Pardo (born 1932), Filipino judge
 Bob Pardo, American military pilot known for the Pardo's Push
 Bruce Jeffrey Pardo, perpetrator of the Covina massacre
 Carlos Pardo (1975–2009), Mexican NASCAR driver
 Carlos Pardo-Villamizar, Colombian neuroscientist
 Claudia Sheinbaum Pardo (born 1962), Mexican scientist, politician, and Mayor of Mexico City
 David Pardo (Dutch rabbi, born at Salonica), (c.1591–1657)
 David Pardo (Dutch rabbi, born in Amsterdam), 17th century rabbi and grandson of the David Pardo born at Salonica.
 David Pardo (Italian rabbi), (1719–1792), rabbinical commentator and liturgical poet
 Don Pardo (1918–2014), American radio and television announcer
 Emilia Pardo Bazán (1851–1921), Galician (Spanish) writer and scholar
 Enrique Cal Pardo (born 1922), Galician (Spanish) writer
 Felipe Pardo (born 1990), Colombian football player
 Felipe Pardo y Aliaga (1806–1868), Peruvian writer, diplomat and politician
 Frank Fernández Pardo (born 1992), Chilean football player
 Herbert Pardo (Hamburg 1887- Haifa 1974), German-born lawyer and politician
 Isaac Pardo, rabbi of Sarajevo
 Isaac Díaz Pardo (1920–2012), Galician (Spanish) artist and businessman
 Isaac J Pardo (1905–2000), Venezuelan historian and physician
 Jacinto Angulo Pardo, Cuban Minister of Internal Trade
 Jacob Pardo, 18th-century rabbi of Ragusa and Spalato
 Jacob Vita Pardo (1822–1843), author and preacher
 Jaime Pardo Leal (1941–1987), Colombian presidential candidate
 J. D. Pardo (born 1980), American actor
 Jimmy Pardo (born 1966), American stand-up comedian, actor, and TV host
 Jorge Pardo (artist), Cuban born artist
 Jorge Pardo (musician) (born 1955), Spanish musician
 José Pardo y Barreda (1864–1947), President of Peru
 José Antonio Pardo Lucas (born 1988), Spanish football player
 Joseph Pardo (c. 1561 – 1619), Italian rabbi and merchant
 Joseph Pardo (c. 1624 – 1677), English hazzan
 Josiah Pardo (1626–1684), Dutch rabbi
 Juan Pardo (explorer), 16th-century Spanish explorer and conquistador
 Juan Pardo de Tavera (1472–1545), Spanish cardinal and Grand Inquisitor
 Laurent Pardo (1961–2016), French bass and cello player for US singer-songwriter Elliott Murphy
 Laurent Pardo (rugby player) (born 1958), French rugby union player
 Luciano Di Pardo (born 1975), Italian long-distance runner born in Germany
 Luis Pardo (1882–1935), Chilean sailor who rescued the Sir Ernest Shackleton's expedition
 Manuel Pardo (politician) (1834–1878), first civilian President of Peru
 Mariano Pardo de Figueroa (1828–1918), Spanish nobleman and philatelist
 Mario Pardo (born 1988), Chilean football player
 Mario Pardo (wrestler) (born 1984), Mexican professional wrestler
Mercedes Pardo (1921-2005), Venezuelan painter
 Moses Pardo (died 1888), rabbi and rabbinical emissary
 Nichole Pardo (born 1970), Ob/Gyn, Top Doctor, Washington DC, 2014
 Orlando Luis Pardo Lazo (born  1972), Cuban blogger
 Pável Pardo (born 1976), Mexican international football player
 Rafael Pardo Rueda (born 1953), Colombian politician
 Rob Pardo (born 1970), computer game designer (Warcraft)
 Ron Pardo, Canadian actor
 Rubén Pardo (racing driver) (born 1979), Mexican NASCAR driver
 Rubén Pardo (footballer) (born 1992), Spanish football player
 Salvador Pardo Cruz, Cuban politician
 Sancho Pardo Donlebún (1537–1607), Spanish seafarer
 Sebastián Pardo (born 1982), Chilean football player
 Sergio Contreras Pardo (born 1983), Spanish football player
 Sharon Pardo (born 1971), Israeli academic
 Silvia Pardo (born 1941), Mexican painter
 Tamir Pardo (born 1953), former Director of the Israeli Mossad
 Thomas Pardo (died 1763), Principal of Jesus College, Oxford
 Thomas Letson Pardo (1840–1925), Canadian politician
 Tomás Barros Pardo (1922–1986), Galician (Spanish) writer and painter
 Trinidad Pardo de Tavera (1857–1925), Filipino historian and physician
 Urko Rafael Pardo (born 1983), Spanish football player born in Belgium

References 

Pardo Jewish surname
Pardo family in Greece
http://www.jewishencyclopedia.com/articles/11906-pardo
https://www.elcorreogallego.es/movil/hemeroteca/un-guino-judio-imperio-celta-FDCG525660 Hebrews of Galicia
http://redaragon.elperiodicodearagon.com/sociedad/heraldica/default.asp?heraldica_id=16&accion=pagina&inicio=20 Latin origin of the name Pardo, Pardus.
https://www.misapellidos.com/significado-de-Pardo-19323.html Pardo name since Roman times.
http://etimologias.dechile.net/?pardoEtymology of the name Pardo from the Latin Pardus. 
Archaeological inscriptions of the name Pardo in Roman times
 https://it.groups.yahoo.com/neo/groups/italianhonestreporting/conversations/messages/37219
 
 http://www.iingen.unam.mx/es-mx/BancoDeInformacion/Entrevistas/Paginas/ClaudiaSheinbaumPardo.aspxm
 http://sefarad-asturias.org/wp/?p=500
 http://yadbeyad.wordpress.com/
Medardo Fraile, Samuel Ros (1904-1945): hacia una generación sin crítica, 1972.
Carlos Blanco-Soler, "La vida atormentada de Samuel Ros", en Cuadernos de Literatura, 1947.
https://apellidos.dechile.net/?Pardo

Surnames
Surnames of Spanish origin
Sephardic surnames
Toponymic surnames